Zandberg, a variant of "Sandberg', means "Sand Mountain". It may refer to:

Places
In the Netherlands:
 Zandberg, Gelderland
 Zandberg, Groningen-Drenthe
 Zandberg, North Brabant, a neighbourhood of Breda
 Zandberg, Zeeland

See also
 Zandberg (surname)